Tiariturris oschneri is an extinct species of small sea snail, a marine gastropod mollusk in the family Pseudomelatomidae, the turrids and allies.

References

 Anderson, Frank Marion, and Bruce Martin. Neocene Record in the Temblor Basin, California: And Neocene Deposits of the San Juan District, San Luis Obispo County. The Academy, 1914.
 A. M. Keen. 1971. Sea Shells of Tropical West America 1-1064

oschneri
Gastropods described in 1914